The 2022 South Australian National Football League (SANFL) grand final was an Australian rules football match played at Adelaide Oval on Sunday, 18 September to determine the premiers for the 2022 SANFL season. 

The match was contested by North Adelaide and Norwood.

References 

SANFL Grand Finals
SANFL Grand Final, 2022